Amir Mirbozorgi (born August 27, 1986) is an Iranian footballer who played for Aluminium Arak of the Azadegan League.

Club career
Mirbozorgi has been with Paykan F.C. since 2008

Club career statistics

 Assist Goals

References

1986 births
Living people
Iranian footballers
Paykan F.C. players
Association football midfielders